Březnice is a town in Příbram District in the Central Bohemian Region of the Czech Republic. It has about 3,500 inhabitants. The historic town centre is well preserved and is protected by law as an urban monument zone.

Administrative parts
The villages of Bor, Dobrá Voda, Martinice, Přední Poříčí and Zadní Poříčí are administrative parts of Březnice.

Geography
It lies in the Benešov Uplands. The Skalice River flows through the town.

History
The first written mention of Březnice is from 1224, when Budislav of Březnice, a member of the royal council, was documented. In 1327, Březnice was first referred to as a market town. Until the Battle of the White Mountain, it was a small market town. In 1621, Březnice was acquired by Přibík Jeníšek of Újezd, who together with his wife started the construction development, founded a Jesuit college and had a new church built.

During the Thirty Years' War, the town was not damaged much, and continued to develop after the war, especially in the 18th century. The Jewish ghetto was founded in 1726. In 1728, Březnice was inherited by the Kolowrat family. In 1872, the town was inherited by the Pálffy family, who owned it until 1945. For centuries, Březnice was an agricultural town. In 1875, the railway was built, and industry began to develop slowly. Between 1918 and 1931, several factories were established.

Demographics

Economy
Březnice is home to the Březnice Castle Brewery, which sells its beer under the Herold brand name.

Sights

Březnice is known for the Březnice Castle, protected as a national cultural heritage. It was built in the 13th century. The castle is surrounded by a Renaissance garden and English landscape garden. Historically significant is its library from 1558, one of the oldest in Bohemia. The castle is open to the public.

Church of Saints Francis Xavier and Ignatius of Loyola is a landmark of historical town centre. It was built by Carlo Lurago in 1642–1650. It includes many valuable paintings and carved sculptures.

The Jewish ghetto is a unique urban complex with preserved Neoclassical houses. The synagogue was built in 1726–1728 and rebuilt in 1874. Březnice served as an important cultural and social centre for Jewish population in a wide area. There is also a Jewish cemetery in the town.

Notable people
Joachim Edler von Popper (1722–1795), merchant, banker and manufacturer
Václav Pichl (1741–1805), composer; served here
Albert Popper (1808–1889), physician and politician
Jiří Veselý (born 1993), tennis player

Twin towns – sister cities

Březnice is twinned with:
 Lindow, Germany

References

External links

Populated places in Příbram District
Cities and towns in the Czech Republic
Prácheňsko
Shtetls